Aggeliki Tsiolakoudi (Greek: Αγγελική Τσιολακούδη, born 10 May 1976 in Alexandroupoli, Greece) is a Greek javelin thrower.

Her personal best throw is 63.14 metres, achieved at the 2002 European Championships in Munich.

Achievements

References

 

1976 births
Living people
Greek female javelin throwers
Athletes (track and field) at the 2000 Summer Olympics
Athletes (track and field) at the 2004 Summer Olympics
Olympic athletes of Greece
Sportspeople from Alexandroupolis
Egyptian people of Greek descent
Olympic female javelin throwers
Mediterranean Games gold medalists for Greece
Mediterranean Games silver medalists for Greece
Mediterranean Games bronze medalists for Greece
Mediterranean Games medalists in athletics
Athletes (track and field) at the 1997 Mediterranean Games
Athletes (track and field) at the 2001 Mediterranean Games
Athletes (track and field) at the 2005 Mediterranean Games
Competitors at the 2001 Summer Universiade
20th-century Greek women
21st-century Greek women